R. gracilis may refer to:
 Reithrodontomys gracilis, the slender harvest mouse, a rodent species
 Rhacheosaurus gracilis, an extinct marine crocodyliform species from the Late Jurassic of Germany
 Rhapis gracilis, the slender bamboo palm, a multi-stemmed palm tree species native to southern China
 Rhogeessa gracilis, the slender yellow bat, a vesper bat species found only in Mexico
 Rhombonotus gracilis, a jumping spider species known from Queensland, Australia

Synonym
 Rana gracilis, a synonym for Fejervarya pulla, a frog species

See also
 Gracilis (disambiguation)